Janina Mrosek (born 18 November 1983 as Janina Wissler) is a German model, actress and TV host. She is known for her appearance in the 2008 music video for Guru Josh Project's song "Infinity 2008".

Biography
She was born in Frankfurt am Main. Her modeling career began when her best friend sent pictures of her to the German Playboy in 2005. She was invited to the shooting, and become the Playboy Playmate of September 2005. She was later playmate of the month for Playboy in 2006 and 2008.

She appeared in the Guru Josh Project's song "Infinity 2008" music video.

She has worked with major German Television companies such as ZDF and RTL. She has presented a weekly show called "Games Report".

She has also appeared in two feature films, Zielgerade (2005) and Heroic Bloodshed (2008).

Although she works as a model full-time, she also works part-time as a graphic designer.

References

External links
 Official site
 

1983 births
Living people
German female models
German film actresses
2000s Playboy Playmates
German television personalities